Alexander Anyaegbunam better known by his stage name Rejjie Snow, is an Irish rapper and songwriter from Drumcondra, Dublin.

Early life
RejjieSnow was born Alexander Anyaegbunam in Dublin, Ireland, to a Nigerian father and an Irish-Jamaican mother. Dublin is his hometown. He attended Belvedere College SJ. Later in 2011, he relocated to the United States and began attending school at Montverde Academy in Florida to play soccer on an athletic scholarship. After graduating high school in 2012, he attended Savannah College of Art and Design in Savannah, Georgia on an athletic scholarship to study film and design. After a semester, he dropped out and moved back to Ireland and focused on his music career. As of May 2021, Snow has a daughter.

Career
Snow released his debut EP, Rejovich, in June 2013. It immediately topped the iTunes Hip-Hop chart, ahead of releases from Kanye West and J. Cole. Its track, "1992", went on to surpass one million YouTube views, along with the previously released "Lost in Empathy". In June 2015, Snow released his official debut single with the Cam O’bi-produced "All Around the World". The video, featuring Lily-Rose Depp, was played 500,000 times in its first week. In December 2015, Snow released his follow-up "Blakkst Skn", produced by Kaytranada.

In 2016, Snow signed with 300 Entertainment (with marketing from BMG Rights Management), with whom he released the track, "D.R.U.G.S", in September. Snow subsequently confirmed that the long-awaited Dear Annie was near completion. In May 2017, Snow released a free mixtape, The Moon & You. Snow's debut album Dear Annie was released on 16 February 2018.

Discography
Studio albums
Dear Annie (2018)
Baw Baw Black Sheep (2021)

Mixtapes
The Moon & You (2017)

EPs
Rejovich (2013)
Dear Annie, Vol. 1 - EP (2018)
Dear Annie, Vol. 2 - EP (2018)

References

External links
Official website

20th-century Irish people
21st-century Irish people
Atlantic Records artists
Irish people of Jamaican descent
Irish people of Nigerian descent
Irish rappers
Living people
Montverde Academy alumni
Musicians from Dublin (city)
People educated at Belvedere College
Savannah College of Art and Design alumni
Black Irish people
1993 births